The Asterousia Mountains are a range in southern Crete separating the Messara Plain from the Libyan Sea.  Evidence of ancient Cretan cultures have been found in excavations performed within sites contained in this range; moreover, one of the most significant Minoan sites on Crete has been excavated at nearby Phaistos to the north; apparently, the Phaistos palace was designed to permit views over the expansive Messara Plain and the Asterousi Mountains. A further historical name for this range is reported by Encyclopædia Britannica as the Kofinos Range, named after the highest peak of Asteroussia, Kofinas (1231 m).

See also
Hagia Triada

References

Mountain ranges of Greece
Landforms of Crete
Landforms of Heraklion (regional unit)